Pegah Ferydoni (born 25 June 1983) is a German actress and singer. Ferydoni left Iran with her family when she was two years old. She started her career as a singer when she was 16 but gave up singing in favour of acting.

Selected filmography

References

External links 

1983 births
Living people
People from Tehran
People from Berlin
German film actresses
Actresses from Tehran
Musicians from Berlin
German television actresses
German people of Iranian descent